Wilson High School is a public K-12 school in Lauderdale County, Alabama, near Florence. It is a part of Lauderdale County School District.

 it had 130 employees, with 80 of them in the faculty, and 1,300 students.

History
It was established in 1916 and occupied its current site in 1920. It later added a high school program with the first class graduating in 1970.

In 2019, the school administration noticed vaping occurring with students in restrooms for male students, and uninstalled bathroom stall doors to address this. The story was re-posted by news channels outside of Alabama.

References

External links
 Wilson School
 

Schools in Lauderdale County, Alabama
Public K-12 schools in Alabama
1916 establishments in Alabama
Educational institutions established in 1916